Angling Club Cottage Platform served the Edinburgh Angling Club in Selkirk, Scottish Borders, Scotland from 1898 to the late 1940s.

History 
The station opened in 1898 by the North British Railway. The station was situated behind 'the nest' and on the north side of the A72. This was a private halt for the members of the Edinburgh Angling Club who were using the club's cottage 'The Nest'. Members of the Edinburgh Angling Club could get special tickets to/from the station but regular passengers had to buy a ticket from the previous/next station. Tickets would be collected at the previous station and passengers would have to buy a ticket in advance. The station closed to passengers and goods traffic in the late 1940s, although the actual date of closure is not recorded.

References

External links 

Disused railway stations in the Scottish Borders
Former North British Railway stations
Railway stations in Great Britain opened in 1898
1898 establishments in Scotland